Aparna Kumar is an Indian mountaineer. Prior to mountaineering, she was a 2002 batch IPS officer of Uttar Pradesh cadre and commanded The 9th Battalion of PAC (Provincial Armed Constabulary which guarded the Chinese border before ITBP came into being). She was awarded the Tenzing Norgay National Adventure Award in 2018 for land adventure by the President of India.

Career and training
In her police career, Aparna Kumar was posted as Commandant 9th Bn. P.A.C. Moradabad. The 9th Bn. P.A.C. had had a past in the high altitudes of Uttaranchal manning the sensitive Indo-Tibetan border at Askot, Badrinath and Uttarkashi . In 1992, the charge of these posts was handed over to the Indo-Tibetan Border Police (ITBP).

In 2002 she completed a foundation course at Lal Bahadur Shashtri Academy of administration in Mussoorie. 

She applied to do the one-month Basic Mountaineering Course at Atal Bihari Vajpayee Institute of Mountaineering and Allied Sports (ABVIMAS) Manali, Himachal Pradesh in October 2013. 

Afterwards she attempted to climb Lobuche East peak (6,119 m/20,075 feet) and was able to summit it in April 2013.  She had to survive in a temperature of -35 degrees and with limited oxygen. In June 2013, she successfully climbed Stok Kangri (approximately 20,182 feet) in Ladakh, becoming the first-ever IPS/All India Service officer to do so.

She completed her advance mountaineering course at ABVIMAS, Manali in July 2014 and became eligible to undertake expeditions. 

She was promoted from SSP to DIG on 2 January 2016.  She was promoted to DIG in January 2017 and posted as DIG technical services in Lucknow. Since October 2017, she is on deputation to Indo-Tibetan Border Police (ITBP). She is currently holding charge as the DIG Dehradun sector covering the China border along the Garhwal Himalayas.

Mountaineering conquests
Aparna Kumar has climbed the seven summits, the seven highest peaks of the seven continents. Once she completes her expedition to the North Pole, she will complete the Explorers Grand Slam, which includes Seven Summits and the Two Poles.

Africa - Kilimanjaro
On 30 August 2014,  she was successful in climbing Mount Kilimanjaro (5,895 m/19,340 feet) in Tanzania, the highest peak in Africa. It was a 15-day, ten-member expedition. She fondly remembered the breathtaking valley view while climbing, and also the enchanting flat Glacier at the top. She unfurled the flag of India and U.P. Police and became the first ever IPS/ All India Service Officer to scale the height.

Oceania - Puncak Jaya
She continued to train and fine tune her rock-climbing skills and improve physical endurance, before her next expedition. On 7 November 2014, She successfully scaled Puncak Jaya (4,884 m/16,024 feet) situated in the West Papuan province of Indonesia, the highest peak in Australia and Oceania. It is considered an extremely challenging climb, as it entailed a high degree of stamina and technical climbing skills. The way to reach the base camp is via Bali island and more than six hours to one of the remotest places on earth, where you require a special permit because of the protected tribal area. She again became the rirst ever IPS/ All India Service Officer (male or female) to achieve this feat.

South America - Aconcagua
After a fortnight's rest , she began her preparation for her next expedition in South America. Mount Aconcagua in Argentina is the highest peak outside the continent of Asia. She did special 15 days of high-altitude training in Manali, Himachal Pradesh to acclimatize and fine-tune her skills in snow craft. 

Amongst the nine-member expedition team one of the members had to be sent back just below the summit, as his condition due to high-altitude pulmonary edema began to deteriorate. On 14 January 2015, she successfully summitted Mount Aconcagua (6,962 m/22,840 feet). The 20-odd days' expedition involved long travel from India and braving height of around 23,000 feet in -35 degrees and lower oxygen levels. She became the first-ever IPS/ All India Service oficer to achieve these feet.

Europe - Elbrus
Kumar reached St. Petersburg, Russia on 25 July along with ten other climbing members to scale Mount Elbrus (5642 metres, around 18,510 feet). The climb was begun on 26 July and on 4 August at around 12.30 pm India time, the team finally reached the summit. She again made history as she became the first ever All India Service officer (IAS, IPS, IFS), male or female, to achieve this feet. She came in communication range on 5 August and shared the good tidings with the family and friends. Successfully climbing Elbrus strengthened her resolve to summit the other three expeditions: Antarctica (Mount Vinson Massif), Asia (Mount Everest) and North America (Mount Denali) in the coming months.

She was proud and elated carrying the tricolour and the flag of Uttar Pradesh Police at the top, in each of her expeditions.

Antarctica - Mount Vinson and South Pole

She started the Antarctica expedition on 5 January 2016 from Delhi to Punta Arenas in Chile via Santiago. She was part of a ten-member expedition team, with other members being from the USA, Canada, South Africa, the U.K., and Australia. At Mount Vinson Massif in Antarctica, her skills in snow craft and pulling her 30 kg sledge on the ice was put to test in the freezing environment of the south pole. The temperature went down to -40 degrees, and at its worst the wind was about 100–120 km per hour..

She reached the union glacier in Antarctica from Puenta Arenas in Chile and started her climb. The team was lucky as they could get a window of climb on their first day of reaching the advanced base camp. They were expected to summit around 23 January but could do so 5 days earlier. On 17 January at 11 pm India Time and 2 pm local time she summited Mount Vinson Massif (about 17,000 feet). Surviving in the icy winds above 100 km per hour and -40 degree temperature took a toll on her, as she lost more than 5 kg of weight and had mild frostbite.

Asia - Mount Everest
The summit to Everest even involves immense risk to life, as year after year, there has been numerous deaths and loss of limbs due to frostbite. The chief minister of Uttar Pradesh sanctioned financial support for her Mount Everest expedition.

She made her first attempt at climbing Mount Everest in April–May 2014, but due to a major avalanche (16 sherpas lost their lives) on Everest, all expeditions were called off by the Nepal government. 

She went for the Mount Everest expedition on 5 April 2015 to Kathmandu. From there she started her trek to the Northside Base camp, China. Unlike her 2014 attempt at climbing Everest, she planned to first scale the Everest from north side and then attempt from the south side in Nepal. No Indian woman has achieved this feat in the same year. The Everest mission had to be called off due to the high-intensity earthquake in Nepal which caused large scale disaster in Nepal and parts of China. Kumar said that watching Everest every day (during her climb up to 25,000 feet this year, before the quake hit) emboldened her to resolve to make it to the top one day.

After two unsuccessful attempts to scale Everest in 2014 and 2015 due to avalanche and earthquake, respectively, she finally did it in 2016. She successfully scaled the highest peak of the world on 21 May 2016, at 11:02 IST. A satellite phone call from the top about the final summit sent a frenzy among all family members and friends. She became the first female IPS officer to achieve this feat. Also, she became the first-ever All India Service officer (male or female) to scale the highest peaks of six continents out of seven. The expedition to conquer Everest began on 9 April 2016 and it took more than 45 days of hardship braving low temperatures up to minus 45 degrees and high-speed chilly winds up to 150 km before she could reach the top. She was climbing from the northern (Chinese) side and had four other team members from USA, Belgium, and India. She had to undertake acclimatization trips up and down climb 1 and base camp, before launching herself for the final assault. She lost almost 13.5 kg during the expedition experienced extreme sunburn and had marginal frostbite and severe chest congestion.

She unfurled the flag of India and UP Police at Everest before she began her climb back to climb three and further down. The last stretch of the climb to the summit is extremely strenuous, and almost 12 hours of the whole night and early morning trek before one reaches the top of Everest. After scaling the mountain, Kumar remarked that "The climb was tough but the view from the top is worth it" .

A call from satellite phone at 11.15 hours IST to her husband sent waves of celebration and a sigh of relief amongst family, friends, and bureaucratic fraternity across the country. It was an emotional moment for her mother who was in Bengaluru with the kids during their summer vacation.

North America - Denali, Alaska
In 2019, she climbed Mount Denali in Alaska and completed her seven summits challenge.

Geographic south pole
Aparna is first ever IPS officer (male or female) to ski her way to the Geographic South Pole in January 2019.

Awards 

 Director's Gold Medal in "Political Concepts and Constitution of India, 72nd Foundation Course-2002", Lal Bahadur Shastri National Academy of Administration (LBSNAA), Mussoorie.
 Vandana Malim Trophy for Best Athlete - 2000 (LBSNAA) Mussoorie.
 Best Athlete Trophy 2003 from SVP National Police Academy (SVPNPA).
 The 51st Batch of Senior Course Officers' Trophy for the first position in Unarmed Combat 2003 SVPNPA.
 Vandana Malik Trophy for Dedication and Hard Work 2004, SVPNPA, Hyderabad.
 Best Battalion Trophy awarded to 9th Battalion of Provincial Armed Constabulary (PAC) on 13 December 2013 when she was posted as Commandant 9th Battalion, PAC, Moradabad.
 Grade-A Certificate and Trainee of Best Rope, Basic Mountaineering Course 2013 awarded by mountaineering institute (ABVIMAS, Manali, Himachal Pradesh, India).
 Grade-A Certificate Advanced  Mountaineering Course 2014 awarded by mountaineering institute (ABVIMAS, Manali, Himachal Pradesh, India).
 Uttar Pradesh Rani Lakshmi Bai Veerta Puraskar - 2015
 Director General of Police (DGP) Commendation Disc. 2016.
 Yash Bharti Samman March 2016. The highest civilian award of the Uttar Pradesh state in India.
 Devi Award by Sunday Standard and Indian Express Group of Newspapers - November 2016
 Director General (DG), Indo-Tibetan Border Police (ITBP) Commendation Roll and Insignia Silver Disc 2018.
 Tenzing Norgay National Adventure Award, 2018 for Land Adventure.
 Director General (DG), Indo-Tibetan Border Police (ITBP) Commendation Roll and Insignia Gold Disc 2021.

Personal life 
Kumar is from Bengaluru and has two children. She firmly believes that the blessings of God and her mother have helped her achieve. She credits her senior officers both in the IAS and IPS who encouraged and supported her throughout.

See also
Indian summiters of Mount Everest - Year wise
List of Mount Everest summiters by number of times to the summit
List of Mount Everest records of India
List of Mount Everest records

References

External links
 http://timesofindia.indiatimes.com/india/UP-IPS-Aparna-Kumar-scales-tallest-peak-in-Antarctica/articleshow/50747382.cms
 https://www.google.co.in/search?q=aparna+kumar+success+story&tbm=isch&tbo=u&source=univ&sa=X&ved=0ahUKEwj8g_nlj-nRAhXFP48KHSjdAMMQsAQINg&biw=994&bih=465
 http://www.hindustantimes.com/india/first-woman-ips-officer-conquers-antarctica-s-highest-peak-hoists-flag/story-t119Ggw61LaDtipDkWxsfN.html
 http://aajtak.intoday.in/crime/story/interesting-story-of-first-lady-ips-officer-aparna-kumar-who-climb-mount-everest-1-874445.html

Year of birth missing (living people)
Living people
Indian mountain climbers
Indian female mountain climbers
Indian summiters of Mount Everest
Recipients of the Tenzing Norgay National Adventure Award